Marion Evans (born Marion Jones; 20 June 1935 in Rhymney, Monmouthshire) is a Welsh historian and writer. She has written extensively about the town of Rhymney and its neighbouring villages and supporting forewords to her publications have been written by Ted Rowlands, Baron Rowlands; George Thomas, 1st Viscount Tonypandy; Eirene White, Baroness White of Rhymney; Roy Noble, BBC Wales; Edwina Hart, Welsh Assembly Minister and Sir Roddy Llewellyn.

Life
From matriculation at Rhymney Grammar School she went to Cheshire County Training College, Crewe to gain her teaching certificate.  She then taught at Hucknall and Tollerton primary schools in Nottinghamshire before returning to her place of birth to teach art and craft at Rhymney Grammar School.  This was followed by a position at Upper Rhymney Primary School where she taught for more than twenty years.  Marion was a founder member of the Rhymney Art Society, a member of the Rhymney Valley Art Society, the National Eisteddfod Art Committee, the Steering Committee of the Rhymney Valley Festival Organisation, a founder member of the Rhymney and District Society and a member of the League of Friends and the Rhymney Historical Society.  She is also a member of the Wales Council for British Archeology.

Work
For many years a keen researcher of local history Marion Evans' first publication took place in 1988 when teaching at Upper Rhymney Primary School. This was an educational aid to environmental studies entitled The Story of our Village, Rhymney
which was supported by the Committee of Wales of the School Curriculum Development Council and used in schools throughout the Wales. Its content gave pupils a broad look at the town, covering topics such as chapels and churches, shops, schools, industry and costume and invited them to pursue their own exercises of discovery.  Marion received a Jon Award for its translation into the Welsh language a number of years later.  That same year she was forced to retire from teaching following a serious road traffic accident but her recovery was therapeutically assisted by throwing herself again into historical research and the production of local history works. There followed, over a number of years, five volumes of her series of A Portrait of Rhymney with cameos of Pontlottyn, Tafarnaubach, Princetown, Abertysswg and Fochriw where each volume takes an in-depth look at the history of Rhymney and its neighbouring villages and the people, whether famous or infamous, who lived through the generations.  In 2008 she produced The History of Andrew Buchan's Rhymney Brewery, a comprehensive study of the company's origins from its inception in 1839 to its demise in 1978 and of the tradesmen and staff who worked there.  In between the above have been produced various articles and booklets for different organisations and newsletters which include A History of the Gelligaer Common, written for the Council for the Protection of Rural Wales,  Clay Pipes, a booklet produced in 1991 for the National Eisteddfod of Wales Committee which was held that year in Rhymney.  In 2006 she wrote a profile of Rhymney's celebrated poet Idris Davies for the Rhymney Community Council to celebrate the rededication of his burial and in 2005 a further booklet entitled A Portrait of the Bent Iron to commemorate the reconstruction of an historical local landmark, commissioned by the Communities First Partnership Board, Rhymney.

Works 
Evans, Marion, (1994), A Portrait of Rhymney with cameos of Pontlottyn, Tafarnaubach, Princetown, Abertysswg and Fochriw, volume 1. Old Bakehouse Publications. .
Evans, Marion, (1995), A Portrait of Rhymney with cameos of Pontlottyn, Tafarnaubach, Princetown, Abertysswg and Fochriw, volume 2. Old Bakehouse Publications. .
Evans, Marion, (1996), A Portrait of Rhymney with cameos of Pontlottyn, Tafarnaubach, Princetown, Abertysswg and Fochriw, volume 3. Old Bakehouse Publications. .
Evans, Marion, (1998), A Portrait of Rhymney with cameos of Pontlottyn, Tafarnaubach, Princetown, Abertysswg and Fochriw, volume 4. Old Bakehouse Publications. .
Evans, Marion, (2007), The History of Andrew Buchan's Rhymney Brewery. Old Bakehouse Publications. .
Evans, Marion, (2009), A Portrait of Rhymney with cameos of Pontlottyn, Tafarnaubach, Princetown, Abertysswg and Fochriw, volume 5. Old Bakehouse Publications. .

References

People from Rhymney
20th-century Welsh historians
Living people
1935 births
British women historians
21st-century Welsh historians